Russell Walker Houston was a state legislator in Mississippi. He represented Issaquena County and Washington County, Mississippi in the Mississippi House of Representatives in 1872 and 1873.

He was born in Tennessee. He died in California.

See also
African-American officeholders during and following the Reconstruction era

References

Year of birth missing
Year of death missing
Members of the Mississippi House of Representatives
African-American politicians during the Reconstruction Era